Bina Refinery is an oil refinery located at Bina Etawa in the Sagar district of Madhya Pradesh, India. It is owned and operated by Bharat Oman Refinery Limited, a wholly owned subsidiary of Bharat Petroleum Corporation Limited. , the capacity of the refinery was 6 million metric tonnes per annum or 43,978,597.06 barrels per annum.

Capacity
The refinery is designed to process 6 MTPA of Arab mix crude (65% Arab light and 35% Arab heavy). It has the flexibility to process other types of Middle East crude oil. It can process crude from an API range of 28 to 40.

References

External links 
 Bharat Oman Refineries Limited

Oil refineries in India
Sagar district
Energy in Madhya Pradesh
Bharat Petroleum buildings and structures
2011 establishments in Madhya Pradesh